Daniel II may refer to:

 Saint Danilo II, Archbishop of Serbs from 1324 to 1337
 Daniel II of Antioch, see List of Maronite Patriarchs
 Daniel II of Armenia, see List of Catholicoi of Armenia
 Daniel II of Prague, see List of bishops and archbishops of Prague
 Daniel II of Terremonde, see Vassals of the Kingdom of Jerusalem
 Daniel II Cardinal Dolfino, Patriarch of Aquileia and Archbishop of Udine
 Danilo I, Prince of Montenegro (1826–1860), known once as bishop Danilo II

See also
 Daniel 2